Carolyn Meline (born February 25, 1935) was a Democratic Idaho State Representative from 2012 to 2014 representing District 29 in the A seat.

Education
Born in Carey, Idaho, Meline graduated from Rupert High School and attended North Idaho College.

Elections
2012 With Republican Representative Ken Andrus redistricted to 28A, Nate Murphy was unopposed for the May 15, 2012 Democratic Primary and won with 726 votes, but withdrew; Meline replaced him, and won the four-way November 6, 2012 General election with 7,971 votes (45.6%) against Republican nominee Dave Bowen, Independent Bob Croker, and a write-in candidate who received 3 votes.

References

External links
Carolyn Meline at the Idaho Legislature
 

Living people
Colorado Women's College alumni
Democratic Party members of the Idaho House of Representatives
People from Carey, Idaho
People from Pocatello, Idaho
Women state legislators in Idaho
1937 births
21st-century American women